Outside the Wall is a 1950 American film noir crime film directed by Crane Wilbur and starring Richard Basehart, Marilyn Maxwell, Signe Hasso and Dorothy Hart.

Plot
Ex-convict Larry Nelson (Basehart), paroled from prison after serving nearly half of his thirty-year sentence, has problems finding employment. Determined to not fall into the clutches of the law again, he takes a job as a lab assistant in a country sanitarium. There he falls for attractive nurse Charlotte (Maxwell). Larry learns that the sanitarium is a front for a robbery syndicate and finally finds himself a clay pigeon for the gang. Sweet-and-wholesome nurse Ann (Hart) helps Larry to get out of the unpleasant situation.

Cast 
 Richard Basehart as Larry Nelson
 Marilyn Maxwell as Charlotte Maynard
 Signe Hasso as Celia Bentner
 Dorothy Hart as Ann Taylor
 Joseph Pevney as Gus Wormser
 Lloyd Gough as Red Chaney
 Harry Morgan as Garth 
 John Hoyt as Jack Bernard 
 Mickey Knox as Latzo

See also
 List of American films of 1950

References

External links
 
 
 
 

1950 films
1950 crime films
American crime films
American black-and-white films
Film noir
Universal Pictures films
1950s English-language films
1950s American films